In algebraic topology, the path space fibration over a based space  is a fibration of the form

where
 is the path space of X;  i.e.,  equipped with the compact-open topology.

The space  consists of all maps from I to X that may not preserve the base points; it is called the free path space of X and the fibration  given by, say, is called the free path space fibration.

The path space fibration can be understood to be dual to the mapping cone. The reduced fibration is called the mapping fiber or, equivalently, the homotopy fiber.

Mapping path space 
(A mapping path space satisfies the universal property that is dual to that of a mapping cylinder, which is a push-out. Because of this, a mapping path space is also called a mapping cocylinder.)

Since a fibration pulls back to a fibration, if Y is based, one has the fibration

Note also  is the composition

Clearly,  is a homotopy equivalence; thus, the above decomposition says that any map is a fibration up to homotopy equivalence.

Moore's path space 
By definition, a path in a space X is a map from the unit interval I to X. Again by definition, the product of two paths  such that  is the path  given by:
.
This product, in general, fails to be associative on the nose: , as seen directly. One solution to this failure is to pass to homotopy classes: one has . Another solution is to work with paths of arbitrary lengths, leading to the notions of Moore's path space and Moore's path space fibration, described below. (A more sophisticated solution is to rethink composition: work with an arbitrary family of compositions; see the introduction of Lurie's paper, leading to the notion of an operad.)

Given a based space , we let

An element f of this set has a unique extension  to the interval  such that . The resulting space is called the Moore path space of X, after John Coleman Moore, who introduced the concept. Then, just as before, there is a fibration, Moore's path space fibration:

Now, we define the product map

.
This product is manifestly associative. In particular, with μ restricted to ΩX × ΩX, we have that ΩX is a topological monoid (in the category of all spaces). Moreover, this monoid ΩX acts on PX through the original μ. In fact,  is an Ω'X-fibration.

Notes

References 

Algebraic topology
Homotopy theory